Ivory Coast's tourism industry has developed significantly since the early 1970s. The country had 11,374 beds in 7,786 hotel rooms and a 70% occupancy rate in 1997. In 1998, there were 301,039 arriving tourists, including more than 73,000 from (Germany), France and United Kingdom. Beaches, tourist villages, and photo safaris through wildlife preserves are some of the main attractions.

Passports are needed for travel into Ivory Coast. Visas are not required for stays of less than 91 days, though a vaccination certificate for yellow fever is required from all foreign visitors. In 2002, the US Department of State estimated the average cost of staying in Abidjan at $160 per day, compared to Yamoussoukro at $98.

References

 
Ivory Coast